The third siege of Gibraltar was mounted between February–June 1333 by a Moorish army under the prince Abd al-Malik Abd al-Wahid of Morocco. The fortified town of Gibraltar had been held by Castile since 1309, when it had been seized from the Moorish Emirate of Granada. The attack on Gibraltar was ordered by the recently crowned Marinid ruler Abu al-Hasan Ali ibn Othman in response to an appeal by the Nasrid ruler Muhammed IV of Granada. The onset of the siege took the Castilians by surprise. The stocks of food in Gibraltar were heavily depleted at the time due to the thievery of the town's governor, Vasco Perez de Meira, who had looted the money that was meant to have been spent on food for the garrison and to pay for the upkeep of the castle and fortifications. After over four months of siege and bombardment by Moorish catapults, the garrison and townspeople were reduced to near-starvation and surrendered to Abd al-Malik.

Start of the siege
In 1309, Castillian troops under Ferdinand IV of Castile captured Gibraltar, then known as the Medinat al-Fath (City of Victory), from the Muslim-ruled Emirate of Granada. Its fortifications were repaired and improved by the Castillians. In 1315 the Granadans attempted to retake Gibraltar in the brief and unsuccessful Second Siege of Gibraltar.

The alliance between the Nasrids of Granada and the Marinids of Morocco had fallen into abeyance following the loss of Gibraltar, but the accession of the Marinid sultan Abu al-Hasan Ali ibn Othman led to a renewal of the pact between the two Muslim states. A force of 7,000 men under the command of Abu al-Hasan's son, Abd al-Malik, was secretly transported across the Strait of Gibraltar to rendezvous with the forces of Muhammad IV of Granada at Algeciras in February 1333. The Castillians were distracted by the coronation of King Alfonso XI and were slow to respond to the invasion force, which was able to lay siege to Gibraltar before much of a response could be organised.

Gibraltar was ill-prepared for this eventuality. Its governor, Don Vasco Perez de Meira, had looted the funds allocated by the crown to pay for food and maintenance of the town's defences, using it to buy land for himself near Jerez. He also misappropriated the food itself, selling it to the Moors, and kept the garrison under strength. The shipwreck of a grain ship off the Gibraltarian coast, only eight days before the siege began, gave the garrison a little extra food supply, but as events were to prove, it was not nearly enough.

The town consisted of a series of individually fortified districts that reached from the dockyard on the sea front to a castle several hundred feet up the slope of the Rock of Gibraltar. By the end of February, Abd al-Malik's forces had captured the dockyard and the area on the Rock above the castle, where he set up siege engines. Castillian attempts to organise a relief force were hampered by Granadan raids on their borders that were intended to divert Castillian attention. In addition, political disputes between Alfonso and his vassals delayed the raising of a land force to lift the siege. Although Alfonso had a naval force at his disposal under Admiral Alfonso Jofre de Tenorio, the Moorish ships supporting the siege were positioned close inshore where it was too dangerous to attempt an attack.

Fall and capture of Gibraltar
It was not until June that Alfonso was able to put a relief force into the field. His senior advisers had argued against staging a relief expedition on the grounds that it would mean fighting both Granada and Fes, which they saw as too much of a risky venture. After eight days of arguments in Seville, Alfonso got his way and was able to persuade his rebellious vassal Juan Manuel, Prince of Villena to support him against the Moors. He marched his army to Jerez, where they camped by the River Guadalete, four days' march from Gibraltar. It was, however, already too late for the defenders.

The situation in Gibraltar was desperate by mid-June. The food had run out and the townspeople and garrison had been reduced to eating their own shields, belts and shoes in an attempt to gain sustenance from the leather from which they were made.  Admiral Jofre attempted to sling bags of flour into the town by firing them over the walls from ship-mounted catapults, but the Moors were able to drive the Castillian ships away. The Moors' own catapults had caused severe damage to Gibraltar's defences and the weakened garrison was in no shape to resist further.

On 17 June 1333, Vasco Perez surrendered Gibraltar after agreeing to terms with Abd al-Malik. It was reported that he had been hoarding a supply of food in his own storerooms, enough for feeding the whole besieged population for five days. He had been keeping a number of well-fed Moorish captives in his own house with the apparent intention of ransoming them. He fled to North Africa to escape punishment for his failures; as chronicler of the king Alfonso XI wrote, "it was his duty either to deliver the fortress into the hands of his lord, the King, or die in its defence." He did neither and was condemned by the Castillians as a traitor. The other defenders were allowed to leave with honour as a mark of respect for their courage in defending the town for so long. The fall of Gibraltar was rapturously received back in Morocco; the Moorish chronicler Ibn Marzuq recorded that while he was studying in Tlemcen, his teacher announced to his class: "Rejoice, community of the faithful, because God has had the goodness to restore Gibraltar to us!" According to Ibn Marzuq, the jubilant students burst out into cries of praise, gave thanks and shed tears of joy.

References

Bibliography
 
 
 

Conflicts in 1333
Sieges of Gibraltar
1333 in Europe
14th century in Gibraltar
14th century in Morocco
Gibraltar
Gibraltar 1333
Gibraltar 1333